NSB Class 87 is a class of 25 diesel-hydraulic railcars built by Strømmens Værksted for the Norwegian State Railways. Seventeen a-series units were delivered in 1941 and equipped with  Deutz prime mover. Eight b-series units were delivered in 1952 and equipped with  Scania-Vabis prime movers. They were used on many branch lines until the 1960s, when the gradual electrification caused most lines instead to be served with Class 86. The a-series was scrapped in 1972 and 1973, while the b-series remained used between Ål and Hønefoss on the Bergen Line until 1975 and on the Flekkefjord Line until 1981.

Specifications
Class 87 is a single-car railcar with seating for 46 people plus 11 folding seats. The class was equipped with a diesel-hydraulic transmission. However, this also have the b-series a  weight, compared to the a-series .

History
The class was ordered for NSB to have a class of smaller railbuses for lines with little traffic. Seventeen units were delivered in 1941, and were originally numbered 18.265–281 and designated Class 7a. Another eight units, the b-series, were delivered in 1952 and numbered 18.301–308. The class was later renumbered Class 87. The trains were used both on mainline routes with little traffic and on branch lines. As the railway network was gradually electrified during the 1950s and 1960s, the need for railcars dropped. Branch line service could easily be handled by the larger and more comfortable Class 86 and 91, and from the late 1960s Class 87 was taken out of use. NSB attempted to sell the units, but as no-one was interested in purchasing them, they were scrapped in 1972 and 1973.

The b-series remained in service on the local service between Ål and Hønefoss on the Bergen Line, but was taken out of service in the mid-1970s. Also the Flekkefjord Line retained the b-series, which was used until 1981, when it was replaced with Class 89. The last six trains were retired on 4 March 1981. No. 87-01 and 03 have been preserved by the Norwegian Railway Club.

References

External links
Entry at the Norwegian Railway Club
Entry at Jernbane.net

87
Vehicles introduced in 1941
Railcars of Norway